Seligpreisung is the fourth album by German band Popol Vuh. It was originally released in 1973 on record label Kosmische Musik. The title is the German name for the Beatitudes, from Christ's Sermon on the Mount.

Release 

In 2004 SPV re-released the album with one bonus track, "Be in Love (Du sollst lieben)", originally released in 1972 on a solo single by Korean vocalist Djong Yun.

Reception 

Perfect Sound Forever described it as "another soaring, beautiful, essential and seminal work, sounding not only unique in the world of music, but among all other Popol Vuh albums."

Track listing 
All tracks composed by Florian Fricke.  Original lyrics from the Gospel of Matthew, revised by Florian Fricke.

2004 bonus track
"Be in Love (Du sollst lieben)" – 4:59

Personnel 

Florian Fricke – piano, cembalo, vocals, production
Daniel Fichelscher – electric guitar (on 2, 3, 4, 6), drums, percussion, production
Conny Veit – electric guitar, 12-string guitar, production
Robert Eliscu – oboe, production
Klaus Wiese – tamboura, production

Guest musicians
Djong Yun – vocals (on 9)
Fritz Sonnleitner – violin (on 9)

 Technical personnel

 Dieter Dierks – engineering
 Heiner – engineering assistance
 Reinhardt Langowski – production
 Ingo Trauer – cover design
 Richard J. Rudow – cover design
 Bettina Fricke – sleeve photography
 Kranz – sleeve photography

References

External links 
 
 Popol Vuh discography
 Seligpreisung at Venco.com.pl

Popol Vuh (band) albums
1973 albums
German-language albums